The Book of the Wars of the Lord is one of several non-canonical books referenced in the Bible which have now been completely lost. It is mentioned in Numbers 21:13–14, which reads:

David Rosenberg suggests in The Book of David that it was written in 1100 BC or thereabouts. Theologian Joseph Barber Lightfoot suggested that it was merely another title for the mysterious biblical Book of Jasher.

The Book of the Wars of the Lord is cited in the medieval Book of Jasher as being a collaborative record written by Moses, Joshua, and the children of Israel.

A notable reference to an unnamed book is found in Exodus 17:14, where God commanded Moses to inscribe an Israelite military victory over the Amalekites in a book and recount it later in the hearing of his successor Joshua. The book is not specifically mentioned by name. However, some Torah scholars such as Moses ibn Ezra have suggested this book may refer to the Book of the Wars of the Lord.

See also
 Bible
 Lost work
 Books of the Bible

References

External links
 Encyclopedia Judaica: Book of the Wars of the Lord
 Jewish Encyclopedia: Book of the Wars of the Lord

Lost Jewish texts
Texts attributed to Moses
Book of Numbers